Lucy "Lu" Corfield (born 1979 or 1980) is a Welsh actress, known for her roles as Freya Wilson in Doctors, Ruth in Last Tango in Halifax and Joyce Edevan in Clink. In 2020, she appeared in the BBC Three series In My Skin.

Career
Raised in Four Crosses near Llanfair Caereinion, Powys, she became head girl at Welshpool High School. Due to study English at university, she caught the acting bug through appearances with the Montgomeryshire Youth Theatre. After A-Levels, she approached Amnesty International to set up a theatre in education company, with which she toured for two years. She then relocated to London and studied acting at RADA for three years.

Since her graduation, Corfield has worked in both stage and television.

Television roles include Vera, Agatha Raisin, Game of Thrones, Candy Cabs, Rev, EastEnders, The Wrong Mans, Watson and Oliver, Stella, Holby City, Casualty. and Last Tango in Halifax.

In April 2012 Corfield was nominated for Best Newcomer at The British Soap Awards for her role as Freya Wilson in Doctors. She returned to the show in 2014.

Video game roles include The Witcher 3: Wild Hunt – Hearts of Stone and Everybody's Gone to the Rapture.

Her theatre work includes shows at The Royal Court Theatre, The Young Vic, Soho Theatre, The Royal Shakespeare Company and with Headlong Theatre.

Corfield is constantly campaigning to improve the rights and visibility of the LGBTQIA Community. She has appeared in the Diversity Role Models Calendar, to show her support towards the prevention of homophobic bullying in UK schools, is a proud Patron of Pride Cymru, and co-founder of House of Pride, a company that creates a platform and spaces for the queer female and non-binary community.

She also appeared in The Green Party's 2014 and 2016 Party Political Broadcasts to show her support for the Party.

In April 2019, it was announced that Corfield was cast in new women's prison drama series, Clink, which is the first-ever scripted drama commissioned for 5Star. She portrays the role of Joyce Edevan, a woman convicted of murdering her girlfriend. She appeared in all ten episode of the first series. It is currently not known if or when the series will return.

In 2019, she appeared in Channel 4's The Accident alongside Sarah Lancashire, Adrian Scarborough, and Ruth Madeley.

In 2020, Corfield worked with Lancashire again and joined the cast of Last Tango in Halifax'' as Ruth, a colleague and potential new love interest for Sarah Lancashire's character, Caroline. Her portrayal of Ruth was highly acclaimed.

Filmography

Film

Television

Video games

References

External links

http://www.cdalondon.com/clients/lu-corfield/

Alumni of RADA
Living people
People from Montgomeryshire
Welsh television actresses
Welsh soap opera actresses
Welsh stage actresses
Welsh video game actresses
Welsh voice actresses
Actresses from London
21st-century Welsh actresses
Year of birth missing (living people)
Place of birth missing (living people)
21st-century English women
21st-century English people
English LGBT actors